"Complete" is a song by British electronic music producer Jaimeson. It was released as a single on 11 August 2003 in the United Kingdom. The single debuted at a peak position of number four on the UK Singles Chart and reached number 27 in the Netherlands.

Track listings
UK CD and 12-inch single
 "Complete" (radio edit) – 3:42
 "Complete" (4x4 remix) – 5:42
 "Complete" (Danny Fresh full 12-inch mix) – 5:58

European CD single
 "Complete" (Phase 2 Mix) – 3:43
 "Complete" (radio edit) – 3:42

Charts

Weekly charts

Year-end charts

References

2003 songs
2003 singles
Jaimeson songs
UK Independent Singles Chart number-one singles
V2 Records singles